Alessandro Cattaneo (born 12 June 1979 in Rho) is an Italian politician.

He is a member of the centre-right party Forza Italia and served as Mayor of Pavia from June 2009 to May 2014.

Cattaneo has been elected for the Chamber of Deputies at the 2018 general election.

See also
2009 Italian local elections
2018 Italian general election
List of mayors of Pavia

References

External links
 

Living people
1979 births
Forza Italia politicians
Forza Italia (2013) politicians
The People of Freedom politicians
21st-century Italian politicians
Mayors of Pavia